(also known as , née ; ca. 1824 – 1894) was the author of a popular Polish-language cookbook,  (The Lithuanian Cook). Her book was first published in Vilnius in 1843, under the pen name W.A.L.Z.

External links 
  Complete scan at Polona.pl.

Cookbook writers
Polish food writers
1824 births
1894 deaths
Women cookbook writers
19th-century women writers
Burials at Saulė Cemetery